

Nervous system
 CNS
 Encephalitis
 Myelitis
 Meningitis
 Arachnoiditis
 PNS
 Neuritis
 eye
 Dacryoadenitis
 Scleritis
 Episcleritis
 Keratitis
 Retinitis
 Chorioretinitis
 Blepharitis
 Conjunctivitis
 Uveitis
 ear
 Otitis externa
 Otitis media
 Labyrinthitis
 Mastoiditis

Cardiovascular system
 Carditis
 Endocarditis
 Myocarditis
 Pericarditis
 Vasculitis
 Arteritis
 Phlebitis
 Capillaritis

Respiratory system
 upper
 Sinusitis
 Rhinitis
 Pharyngitis
 Laryngitis
 lower
 Tracheitis
 Bronchitis
 Bronchiolitis
 Pneumonitis
 Pleuritis
 Mediastinitis

Digestion system

Mouth
 Stomatitis
 Gingivitis
 Gingivostomatitis
 Glossitis
 Tonsillitis
 Sialadenitis/Parotitis
 Cheilitis
 Pulpitis
 Gnathitis

Gastrointestinal tract
 Esophagitis
 Gastritis
 Gastroenteritis
 Enteritis
 Colitis
 Enterocolitis
 Duodenitis
 Ileitis
 Caecitis
 Appendicitis
 Proctitis

Accessory digestive organs
 Hepatitis
 Ascending cholangitis
 Cholecystitis
 Pancreatitis
 Peritonitis

Integumentary system
 Dermatitis
 Folliculitis
 Cellulitis
 Hidradenitis

Musculoskeletal system
 Arthritis
 Dermatomyositis
 soft tissue
 Myositis
 Synovitis/Tenosynovitis
 Bursitis
 Enthesitis
 Fasciitis
 Capsulitis
 Epicondylitis
 Tendinitis
 Panniculitis
 Osteochondritis: Osteitis/Osteomyelitis
 Spondylitis
 Periostitis
 Chondritis

Urinary system
 Nephritis
 Glomerulonephritis
 Pyelonephritis
 Ureteritis
 Cystitis
 Urethritis

Reproductive system

Female
 Oophoritis
 Salpingitis
 Endometritis
 Parametritis
 Cervicitis
 Vaginitis
 Vulvitis
 Mastitis

Male
 Orchitis
 Epididymitis
 Prostatitis
 Seminal vesiculitis
 Balanitis
 Posthitis
 Balanoposthitis

Pregnancy/newborn
 Chorioamnionitis
 Funisitis
 Omphalitis

Endocrine system
 Insulitis
 Hypophysitis
 Thyroiditis
 Parathyroiditis
 Adrenalitis

Lymphatic system
 Lymphangitis
 Lymphadenitis

Physiology
Inflammations